Phtheochroa canariana is a species of moth of the family Tortricidae first described by William Barnes and August Busck in 1920. It is found in the United States, where it has been recorded from Arizona.

Taxonomy
It is often listed as a synonym of Phtheochroa fulviplicana.

References

Moths described in 1920
Phtheochroa